Lone Elm is an unincorporated community in Jasper County, in the U.S. state of Missouri.

The community was named for a large individual elm tree near the original town site. A variant name was "Turkey".

References

Unincorporated communities in Jasper County, Missouri
Unincorporated communities in Missouri